Kerala Awards are highest state-level civilian awards instituted by the government of the Indian state of Kerala on the model of the Padma Awards instituted by Government of India. The establishment of the awards to be conferred on individuals who have made "priceless contribution to the society" was announced by Chief Minister Pinarayi Vijayan on 20 October 2021. The names of the awardees are to be announced every year on 1 November, which is observed as the Kerala Piravi day or Kerala Day.

Categories of Kerala Awards

The Kerala Awards are of three categories.

Kerala Jyothi: This is the highest award and will be conferred only on one person.
Kerala Prabha: This is the second highest award and is conferred on three individuals.
Kerala Sree: This is the third highest award and is conferred on six persons.

The awardees are to be selected by a special award committee after scrutiny by two subordinate committees and would be distributed in a ceremony that would be held in the Raj Bhavan, the official residence of the Governor.

First awardees

The winners of the maiden Kerala Awards were announced on 1 November 2022.

Kerala Jyothi

M. T. Vasudevan Nair (literature), Malayalam literary stalwart

Kerala Prabha

Mammootty (arts), Indian-Malayalam actor
Omchery N. N. Pillai (arts, drama, social service, public service), Delhi-based Malayalam playwright
T. Madhava Menon (civil service, social service), former civil servant and social worker

Kerala Sree
Gopinath Muthukad (social service, arts), magician
Kanayi Kunhiraman (arts), sculptor
Kochouseph Chittilappilly (social service, industry), industrialist
M. P. Parameswaran (science, social service), scientist
Dr. Sathyabhama Das Biju (science), amphibian biologist
Vaikom Vijayalakshmi (arts), singer

See also
Orders, decorations, and medals of India

References

Civil awards and decorations of India
Indian awards
Awards for contributions to society